, also called "death pictures" or "death portraits", are Japanese woodblock prints, particularly those done in the ukiyo-e style popular through the Edo period (1603–1867) and into the beginnings of the 20th century.

When a kabuki actor died, memorial portraits  were conventionally published with his farewell poem and posthumous name.

Memorial portraits were created by ukiyo-e artists to honor a colleague or former teacher who had died.

Gallery

See also
 List of ukiyo-e terms

References

Bibliography
 Keyes, Roger S. and Keiko Mizushima. (1973). The Theatrical World of Osaka Prints: a Collection of Eighteenth and Nineteenth Century Japanese woodblock Prints in the Philadelphia Museum of Art.Philadelphia: Philadelphia Museum of Art. OCLC 186356770
 Newland, Amy Reigle. (2005). The Hotei Encyclopedia of Japanese Woodblock Prints. Amsterdam : Hotei. ;  OCLC 61666175

External links 
  Viewing shini-e
  "Shini-e: the Performance of Death in Japanese Kabuki Actor Prints"
 Kuniyoshi project: Shini-e

Ukiyo-e genres
Japanese words and phrases